Blues Bender P.A.C. are a series of 10-hole harmonicas produced by Hohner. The "P.A.C." stands for Patented Acoustic Covers, a reference to the harmonica cover design patented by Jacob Hohner in 1897 and mostly used on the Hohner Marine Band. The Blues Bender set contains harmonica's in the keys of G, A, Bb, C, D, E and F. The harmonica features airtight construction for easier note bending, acoustic cover plates which increase the volume of the air between the reeds, and thicker reed plates for consistent tone.

See also 
 Hohner
 Blues harp

References 

Harmonica